Stefan Rumpler (born 17 September 1992) is an Austrian sport shooter.

He participated at the 2018 ISSF World Shooting Championships, winning a medal.

References

External links

Living people
1992 births
Austrian male sport shooters
ISSF rifle shooters
Shooters at the 2010 Summer Youth Olympics
People from Zell am See District
Sportspeople from Salzburg (state)